Dyschirius guatemalenus is a species of ground beetle in the subfamily Scaritinae. It was described by Henry Walter Bates in 1881.

References

guatemalenus
Beetles described in 1881